Khumeh Zar-e Olya (also Romanized as Khūmeh Zār-e ‘Olyā; also known as Boneh-ye Khūmehzār, Khūmeh Zār, Shapachu, Shīb Jū, and Shīveh Jū) is a former village in Bakesh-e Yek Rural District, in the Central District of Mamasani County, Fars Province, Iran. At the 2006 census, its population was 93, in 21 families.  It is now part of the city of Khumeh Zar.

References 

Former populated places in Fars Province